White Trash, Two Heebs and a Bean is the fourth studio album by the American punk rock band NOFX. It was released on November 5, 1992, through Epitaph Records. It is the first NOFX album to feature El Hefe on guitar, replacing Steve Kidwiller, who left the band in 1991. White Trash, Two Heebs and a Bean was also the first NOFX album not produced by Brett Gurewitz, who produced the band's first three albums. According to the liner notes for the album, the original title was going to be White Trash, Two Kikes and a Spic, but one of the band members' family members thought it was offensive, so they changed it to the title of the actual release. The title is a reference to the eclectic ethnic identities of the band members: white "trash" (Erik Sandin), two Jews (Fat Mike and Eric Melvin), and a Hispanic (El Hefe).

Track listing
All songs were written by Fat Mike except "Straight Edge," originally by Minor Threat.

Personnel
 Fat Mike – Bass, composer, vocals, producer
 Eric Melvin – Guitar, producer
 Erik Sandin – Drums, producer
 El Hefe – Guitar, trumpet, producer
 Mike Lavella – Backing vocals, voices
 Donnell Cameron – Producer, engineer
 Bob Geller – Engineer
 MW – Art direction, design
 NOFX – Producer
 Joe Peccerillo – Engineer
 Eddy Schreyer – Mastering
 Dan Winters – Photography

References

External links

White Trash, Two Heebs and a Bean at YouTube (streamed copy where licensed)

NOFX albums
1992 albums
Epitaph Records albums